The forerunner of the NCAA, the IAAUS, was founded in 1905. At that time, the following 39 schools joined.

 Allegheny College
 Amherst College
 Bucknell University
 Colgate University
 University of Colorado
 Dartmouth College
 Denison University
 Dickinson College
 Franklin & Marshall College
 George Washington University
 Grove City College
 Haverford College
 Lehigh University
 Miami University (Ohio)
 University of Minnesota
 University of Missouri
 University of Nebraska
 New York University
 Niagara University
 University of North Carolina
 Oberlin College
 Ohio Wesleyan University
 University of Pennsylvania
 University of Rochester
 Rutgers College
 Seton Hall College
 Swarthmore College
 Syracuse University
 Tufts University
 Union College
 United States Military Academy
 Vanderbilt University
 Washington & Jefferson College
 Wesleyan University
 Western University (Pennsylvania)
 Westminster College (Pennsylvania)
 Williams College
 Wittenberg University
 College of Wooster

Footnotes

References

Charter members
NCAA
Lists of sports teams in the United States